DBA - The Barge Association is a club for leisure users of European inland waterways. 
The club was  formed in 1992 as "The Dutch Barge Association", by a small group of UK owners of Dutch barges. It later expanded to include any form of barge and other types of boat with the same interests in cruising in European rivers and canals, becoming "DBA - The Barge Association", DBA for short.

DBA maintains an active website with much information about barges and the European waterways, including purchase, training, regulations and technical advice. It contains a Waterways Guide with moorings and waterside facilities, frequently updated by members as they travel, and an active Forum for members to exchange information and advice.    
DBA publishes a bi-monthly magazine, Blue Flag, plus an online newsletter in the other months.
DBA representatives attend meetings with Waterway authorities throughout Europe, and work with other organisations, to support its members' interests.   

DBA's aims are to:
 Promote interest in barging
 Be the representative body for non-commercial barging
 Be the premier source of barging information
 Establish contact with and influence other relevant clubs, societies, navigation authorities and trade associations.
 Keep members informed on all barge related topics
 Facilitate communication between members to provide the opportunity for discussion of all aspects of barging. 

The club's members are from all over the world. Many are retired and have time for extended cruising, sometimes all summer; but an increasing number are younger members who are able to work from their boat. Some are permanently living aboard, whether travelling or static. Members' boats range from 14m to 38m LOA, split around 50:50 above:below 20m LOA. About half are conversions of old commercial barges, with an increasing number of purpose-built pleasure craft, like. who manufacture Dutch-style motor barges.

The EU Recreational Craft Directive 
Leisure boats and barges up to 24m built in Europe since 1994  must comply with the EU's Recreational Craft Directive (RCD) which creates and defines four categories: A, B, C, and D. 
B - limited to offshore navigation; (winds up to Force 8 & waves up to 4 metres).
C - limited to inshore (coastal) navigation; (winds up to Force 6 & waves up to 2 metres). 
D - limited to rivers, canals and small lakes; (winds up to Force 4 & waves up to 0.5 metres).

The Community Inland Navigation Certificate 
If your boat is going to be used on the European mainland waterways and qualifies as below then it may need a Community Inland Navigation Certificate ('Community Certificate') confirming that it meets the technical requirements for pleasurecraft (now ES-TRIN, was TRIWV). It does not apply in UK waters. 

A community inland navigation (ES-TRIN) certificate is required for craft with a length >20 metres OR whose multiple of length x beam x draught in metres is 100 or over, where Length excludes bowsprit and rudder; Breadth excludes rubbing strake and paddle wheels; Draught excludes keel from lowest point of hull). So ES-TRIN applies to

a 14.99m ship with a beam of 4.5m and 1.5m draught
a 19m ship with a beam of 4.5m and 1.2m draught

Barge publications 
Blue Flag - the DBA's bi-monthly magazine for members
The Barge Buyer's Handbook - DBA members - DBA Publications - 2022
A Guide to Motor Barge Handling - Edward Burrell - DBA Publications - 2005
The Dutch Barge Book - David Evershed - 1997 - 
The Dutch Motor Barge Book - David Evershed - 2017 - 
Sell up and Cruise the Inland Waterways - Bill & Laurel Cooper - 2010 -

Barge travelogues 
Travels with 'Lionel - Hart Massey - 1988 - Gollancz - 
The Leaky Iron Boat - Hart Massey - 1997 - Stoddart - Leontyne': By Barge from London to Vienna - Richard Goodwin - 1989 - Collins - 
Watersteps through France - Bill & Laurel Cooper - Adlard Coles Nautical - 1991 -  
Back Door to Byzantium - Bill & Laurel Cooper - Adlard Coles Nautical - 1997 -  
Watersteps round Europe - Bill & Laurel Cooper - Adlard Coles Nautical - 1996 - 
Narrow Dog to Carcassonne - Terry Darlington - Bantam Press - 2005 - 
Narrow Dog to Indian River - Terry Darlington - Bantam Press - 2008- 
Narrow Dog to Wigan Pier - Terry Darlington - Bantam Press - 2012 -
The Voyages of 'The Princess Matilda''' - Shane SpallImages of 'The Princess Matilda'   - Ebury Press - 2012 - Just Passing Through - Mary-Jane Houlton - eBook edition - 2020 - Barging into Southern France - Gerard Morgan-Grenville- David & Charles - 1973 - Barging into France - Gerard Morgan-Grenville - David & Charles - 1975 - Barging into Burgundy'' - Gerard Morgan-Grenville - David & Charles - 1975 -

See also
Cruising Association - a club primarily serving marine sailors and cruisers, but which also encompasses barging on inland waterways.
Inland Waterways Association - a club primarily serving narrowboat and widebeam users on the British canal system.
List of waterway societies in the United Kingdom

References

Barges
Clubs and societies in the United Kingdom
Organisations based in the United Kingdom